The 1996 All-Ireland Under-21 Hurling Championship was the 33rd staging of the All-Ireland Under-21 Hurling Championship since its establishment by the Gaelic Athletic Association in 1964. The championship began on 12 June 1996 and ended on 10 September 1996.

Tipperary entered the championship as the defending champions, however, they were beaten by Cork in the Munster semi-final.

On 10 September 1995, Galway won the championship following a 1-14 to 0-7 defeat of Wexford in the All-Ireland final. This was their 7th All-Ireland title overall and their first championship title since 1993.

Cork's Joe Deane was the championship's top scorer with 4-09.

Results

Munster Under-21 Hurling Championship

Quarter-finals

Semi-finals

Final

Leinster Under-21 Hurling Championship

Quarter-finals

Semi-finals

Final

Ulster Under-21 Hurling Championship

Semi-finals

Final

All-Ireland Under-21 Hurling Championship

Semi-finals

Final

Championship statistics

Top scorers

Top scorers overall

References

Under
All-Ireland Under-21 Hurling Championship